High Throughput X-ray Spectroscopy mission may refer to:
Constellation-X Observatory
XMM-Newton